Colonel Mariano Chico Navarro (1796–1850) served one of the briefest terms as Alta California governor from April 1836 to July 1836. He was both preceded and succeeded by the equally unpopular Lieutenant Colonel Nicolás Gutiérrez, who joined him in exile in Mexico on November 5, 1836, by a northern revolt.

References

Sources

1796 births
1850 deaths
Governors of Mexican California
Californios
19th-century American politicians